My Epic is an American Christian rock band from Charlotte, North Carolina started in 2005. They released an independent EP in 2006 entitled This Is Rescue, and two successive albums and one EP with Dreamt Records entitled I Am Undone (2008), Yet (2010) and 2011's Broken Voice EP. In 2013, the band released their debut album with Facedown Records entitled Behold that has seen commercial success.

Background

The members of My Epic began working together as early as 1998, under the name the Right Wing Conspiracy, which later became Shaddai. It wasn't until 2004, after the band played their first successful show before a few hundred fans, did the band become My Epic. At the time, the band was composed of three members: Aaron Stone handled lead vocals and electric guitar, while his younger brother Jesse played drums, and Jeremiah Austin played bass. They recorded an untitled demo in 2005 five that consisted of four songs; the band recently made this demo available online as a free download. The following year, the band independently recorded their first EP, This Is Rescue. My Epic's first full-length studio album came in 2008, entitled I Am Undone. It was released through Dreamt Music, an imprint of Facedown Record. The band returned to the studio in 2010 to record their spectacular follow-up album, Yet. After this 2010 release, Jesse Stone left the band to pursue personal matters. To record their third studio album, Broken Voice, in 2011, My Epic brought in Tanner Morita, of A Hope for Home, to play bass and Matt Doran to play drums, thus evolving the band into a four-piece. Following this release, Doran departed, and Stone returned to the band to play drums. Jeremiah Austin also returned to the band to play bass, thus shifting Tanner Morita to electric guitar and keyboard. Now with their original line-up intact, with the addition of Morita, the band transferred to Facedown Records in 2013 to record and release Behold, their third studio album.

Music
The band were on Dreamt Records from 2008–11 and released two albums and one EP, and 2013 the band released their first album with Facedown Records.

Independent EP
The band released one independent EP in 2006 entitled This Is Rescue.

Studio work
The band released their first studio album I Am Undone on August 5, 2008, with Dreamt Records, as well as, and their second Yet on July 6, 2010. Also, they released commercially successful Broken Voice EP on July 5, 2011 with Dreamt Records.  The bands' first album with Facedown Records entitled Behold that released on December 10, 2013 saw success on the Billboard Christian Albums and Heatseekers Albums charts at Nos. 26 and 7 respectively.

Members
Current members
 Aaron Stone – vocals, guitar (2005–present)
 Jesse Stone – drums, backing vocals (2005-2010, 2011–present)
 Jeremiah Austin – bass guitar (2005-2010, 2011–present)
 Tanner Morita – bass guitar (2010-2011) guitar, keyboard, backing vocals (2011–present)
 Nate Washburn – guitars (2017–present)

Former members
 "Cousin" Matt Doran – drums (2010-2011)

Touring musicians
 Jordan McGee (Advent) – drums (2016)
 Alex Camarena (Silent Planet, Nothing Left) – drums (2019)

Discography

Independent EPs
This Is Rescue (2006)

Studio EPs

Studio albums

References

External links
 
 HM Magazine story

Facedown Records artists
Musical groups established in 2005
Musical groups from North Carolina
2005 establishments in North Carolina